This is a list of literary fiction which feature opera in the plot. "Features" excludes fleeting mentions: for a literary work to be on this list opera must be a significant part of the plot, or, alternatively, provide significant context and backdrop.

References

Fiction
Opera